Émile Salvi (born 10 September 1936) is a French skier. He competed in the Nordic combined event at the 1968 Winter Olympics.

References

External links
 

1936 births
Living people
French male Nordic combined skiers
Olympic Nordic combined skiers of France
Nordic combined skiers at the 1968 Winter Olympics
Sportspeople from Isère